Woolridge is a village in Gloucestershire, England.

Woolridge may also refer to:

Andre Woolridge, American basketball player
Edward Woolridge, American Negro league baseball player
Elizabeth Woolridge Grant, American musician professionally known as Lana Del Rey
Orlando Woolridge, American basketball player
Randolph Woolridge, cricket player

See also
Wooldridge (disambiguation)